Kimberley Clark Rosen (born October 8, 1958) is an American politician from Maine. A Republican, Rosen represented the towns of Orrington and her residence in Bucksport in the Maine House of Representatives from 2004 to 2012, when she was unable to run for re-election due to term-limits. She married former State Senator Richard Rosen, whom she replaced as State Representative. Either Richard or Kimberley Rosen represented Bucksport and Orrington from 1998 to 2004.

Upon the retirement of Republican State Senator Edward Youngblood in July 2014, Kim Rosen announced she would seek to replace him in the State Senate. She was later chosen as the Republican nominee by caucus.

Rosen graduated from the University of Maine and D'Lor Beauty School. She and her husband Richard owned Rosen's Department, until it closed in Spring 2013. Richard Rosen's grandparents opened the store in 1910 and moved it to Bucksport in 1929.

In November 2014, Rosen was elected to replace Youngblood.

References

External links
 Maine goal: Eradicate cervical cancer by Kimberly Rosen, March 21, 2010

Living people
University of Maine alumni
Women state legislators in Maine
Republican Party members of the Maine House of Representatives
People from Bucksport, Maine
Businesspeople from Maine
1958 births
21st-century American politicians
21st-century American women politicians
People from Aroostook County, Maine